Neoregelia zonata is a species of flowering plant in the genus Neoregelia. This species is endemic to Brazil.

Cultivars
 Neoregelia 'Golden Charm'
 Neoregelia 'Piccador'
 Neoregelia 'Red Waves'
 Neoregelia 'Western Sky'
 Neoregelia 'Zodonta'

References

BSI Cultivar Registry Retrieved 11 October 2009

zonata
Flora of Brazil